Mount Gilbert is a  mountain located on the crest of the Sierra Nevada range in California, United States. It is situated on the shared boundary of Kings Canyon National Park and John Muir Wilderness, and along the common border of Fresno County and Inyo County. Mount Gilbert ranks as the 127th-highest summit in California.

History
This mountain's name commemorates eminent geologist Grove Karl Gilbert (1843–1918), who worked much of the Sierra Nevada range with the Wheeler Survey. The mountain's name was officially adopted in 1911 by the U.S. Board on Geographic Names. The first ascent of the peak was made September 15, 1928, by Norman Clyde, who is credited with 130 first ascents, most of which were in the Sierra Nevada.

Climbing
Established climbing routes:

 Southwest slope –  – September 15, 1928, by Norman Clyde
 Northeast slope – class 3 – May 19, 2002, by party of seven
 Engram Couloir – class 5.6 – September 3, 1972 by Al Fowler, Dan Eaton, Ron Cale
 West face – class 5.7 – 1985 by Claude Fiddler, Vern Clevenger

Climate
Mount Gilbert is located in an alpine climate zone. Most weather fronts originate in the Pacific Ocean, and travel east toward the Sierra Nevada mountains. As fronts approach, they are forced upward by the peaks, causing them to drop their moisture in the form of rain or snowfall onto the range (orographic lift). Precipitation runoff from this mountain drains south into the Middle Fork Kings River, and north into Bishop Creek.

See also

 Mount Gilbert

References

External links

 Weather forecast: Mount Gilbert

Inyo National Forest
Mountains of Inyo County, California
Mountains of Fresno County, California
Mountains of Kings Canyon National Park
Mountains of the John Muir Wilderness
North American 3000 m summits
Mountains of Northern California
Sierra Nevada (United States)